Arthur William Rayson (1 December 1898 – 21 January 1970) was an Australian rules footballer who played for Geelong in the VFL.

Family

The son of George Rayson (1873-1960), and Minnie Rayson (1876-1939), née Dawson, Arthur William Rayson was born at Dunolly, Victoria on 1 December 1898.

He married May Perrett (1900-1984) in 1922. They had three children: a daughter, Dorothy, and two sons, Alan Arthur Rayson (1924–1982), and Coleman Medalist Noel Douglas Rayson (1933–2003), both of whom played for Geelong.

Football
Recruited to Geelong from the Cobden Football Club, Rayson was a rover who liked to use the stab kick. He played at half-forward flank in Geelong's 1925 premiership team.

Geelong (Seconds)
He kicked 4 goals, and was one of Geelong's best players in the team that won the VFL's 1923 "Junior League" premiership, against Richmond, 9.12 (66) to 5.10 (40), despite having to play the entire second half with only 17 men.

Geelong (Firsts)

7 August 1926

It is important to note that Main and Allen, (2002, p. 336) have, along with Feldman and Holmesby (1992), become confused between John Thomas "Jack" Shelton and the other St Kilda Shelton (John Frederick "Jack" Shelton). John Thomas "Jack" Shelton was not in the St Kilda team that played against Geelong at the Corio Oval on 7 August 1926, but John Frederick "Jack" Shelton did play for St Kilda on that day. Therefore, the "Shelton" mentioned in the account of the thuggery directed, particularly, at Rayson (who also worked as the caretaker at the Corio Oval), by members of the St Kilda team, and the account of the spectators' response to Rayson's injury (which included broken ribs), specifically directed at Shelton, refers exclusively to John Frederick "Jack" Shelton, and not John Thomas "Jack" Shelton  (as Feldman and Holmesby, and Main and Allen have mistakenly supposed).

Death
He died at Geelong West, Victoria on 21 January 1970.

Footnotes

References

 Feldman, Jules & Holmesby, Russell, The Point of it All: The Story of the St Kilda Football Club, Playwright (on behalf of the St Kilda Football Club), (Sydney), 1992.
 Holmesby, Russell & Main, Jim (2007). The Encyclopedia of AFL Footballers. 7th ed. Melbourne: Bas Publishing.
 Main, J. & Allen, D., "Shelton, J.T. 'Jack'", pp. 335–337 in Main, J. & Allen, D., Fallen – The Ultimate Heroes: Footballers Who Never Returned From War, Crown Content, (Melbourne), 2002.

External links
 
 

1898 births
1970 deaths
Australian rules footballers from Victoria (Australia)
Geelong Football Club players
Geelong Football Club Premiership players
Cobden Football Club players
1926 in Australian rules football
One-time VFL/AFL Premiership players